Scrotochloa is a genus of Asian, Australian, and Papuasian plants in the grass family.

The genus is closely related to Leptaspis and included inside that group by some authors.

 Species
 Scrotochloa tararaensis (Jansen) Judz. - New Guinea, Queensland
 Scrotochloa urceolata (Roxb.) Judz. - New Guinea, Queensland, Solomon Islands, Bismarck Archipelago, Philippines, Malaysia, Java, Borneo, Lesser Sunda Islands, Vietnam, Thailand, Myanmar, India, Sri Lanka

References

Poaceae
Poaceae genera